Henri "Rik" Hoevenaers (1 May 1902 – 12 November 1958) was a Belgian road cyclist who won three medals at the 1924 Summer Olympics, including a silver in the individual time trial, a silver in the team time trial (with Alphonse Parfondry and Jean Van Den Bosch), and a bronze in the team pursuit (with Van Den Bosch, Léonard Daghelinckx and Fernand Saivé). He also won the road race at the 1925 World Championships. Hoevenaers turned professional in 1926. His father Josef and son Jos were also professional cyclists.

References

1902 births
1958 deaths
Belgian male cyclists
Olympic cyclists of Belgium
Olympic silver medalists for Belgium
Olympic bronze medalists for Belgium
Cyclists at the 1924 Summer Olympics
Olympic medalists in cycling
Cyclists from Antwerp
Medalists at the 1924 Summer Olympics
20th-century Belgian people